Alwoodley is an electoral ward of Leeds City Council in the north of Leeds, West Yorkshire, covering the urban suburb areas of Alwoodley, the majority of Moor Allerton (above the Leeds Outer Ring Road) and Slaid Hill.

Boundaries 
The Alwoodley ward includes Slaid Hill and Wigton, the south western and most populous parts of the civil parish of Harewood. Its predecessor, the North ward, also contained the actual village of Harewood and surrounding villages in the parish, including Wike. They currently sit in the neighbouring Harewood ward.

Councillors since 1980 

 indicates seat up for re-election.
 indicates seat up for election following resignation or death of sitting councillor.
* indicates incumbent councillor.

Elections since 2010

May 2022

May 2021

May 2019

May 2018

May 2016

May 2015

May 2014

May 2012

May 2011

May 2010

Notes

References

Wards of Leeds